Sports Day is a 1945 short film directed by Francis Searle for Gaumont-British Instructional.  It features early appearances of Jean Simmons and Peter Jeffrey.

Premise
A schoolboy almost misses the school sports day when he is wrongly punished for cruelty to a dog.

Cast
Jean Simmons as Peggy
Peter Jeffrey as Tom
Roy Russell as Col. House
Ernest Borrow as Headmaster
David Anthony as Bill

Notes

Francis Searle, the director, worked with Gaumont-British Screen Services and Gaumont-British Instructional for seven years.  Interviewed in 1995,  he explained the situation when the Second World War broke out.  "We were put on the reserved list and seconded to the Army , Navy and  Air Force for training films , in conjunction with the MoI –  we made films like Citizens Advice Bureau, and  Sam Pepys joins the Navy, Hospital Nurse. " In the interview  he describes  how he came to work with Jean Simmons.

“I also worked at Merton Park with Jean Simmons, who I cast in a short picture. Mary Field and Bruce Woolf were the bosses at GBI. (Gaumont-British Instructional). Mary Field did children's films and she had a film she offered to me (Sports Day, 1945). Aida Foster, who was a big agent for juveniles, set up an audition and Jean, aged about fourteen, came on as bright as a button; she had learned the part and that was it. I didn't bother looking at any of the others.'

References

1945 films
British black-and-white films